Mount Cheops is a mountain, over  high, standing  south-southeast of Cape Garcia on the west coast of Graham Land. It was mapped by the Falkland Islands Dependencies Survey from photos taken by Hunting Aerosurveys Ltd in 1956–57, and named by the UK Antarctic Place-Names Committee after the Great Pyramid of Giza (also known as the Pyramid of Cheops) because of its distinctive shape.

References 

Mountains of Graham Land
Graham Coast